The 1894 Wyoming Cowboys football team represented the University of Wyoming as an independent during the 1894 college football season. In its first season under head coach Justus F. Soule, a professor of Latin and Greek, the team compiled a perfect 3–0 record. In games against a Laramie town team, the Wilson Beauties, and the No. 5 Hose Company, the team outscored opponents by a total of 46 to 6.

For the first of three consecutive years, Herbert J. Brees was the team captain. Brees was a native of Laramie who went on to a career in the United States Army. He retired from the Army in 1941 with the rank of lieutenant general.

It was not until 1895 that the team began intercollegiate play.

Schedule

References

Wyoming
Wyoming Cowboys football seasons
College football undefeated seasons
Wyoming Cowboys football